Grobniki  is a historical village located in Poland, in the Opole Voivodeship, Głubczyce County and Gmina Głubczyce.

Notable residents
 Karl Proske (1794-1861)

References

Villages in Głubczyce County